Temple Theater or Temple Theatre may refer to:

 Temple Theater (Meridian, Mississippi), listed on the National Register of Historic Places (NRHP) in Mississippi
 Temple Theatre (Sanford, North Carolina), listed on the NRHP in North Carolina
 Temple Theatre (Saginaw, Michigan)
 Temple Theatre in Brantford, Ontario, now known as The Sanderson Centre
 Masonic Temple Theater, Mount Pleasant, Iowa, listed on the NRHP in Henry County, Iowa
 Masonic Temple Building-Temple Theater, Tacoma, Washington, listed on the NRHP in Washington